The Verde River (Yavapai: Haka'he:la) is a major tributary of the Salt River in the U.S. state of Arizona. It is one of the largest perennial streams in Arizona.

Description 
The river begins below the dam at Sullivan Lake, fed by Big Chino Wash and Williamson Valley Wash in Yavapai County. The Verde flows freely for  through private, state, tribal and United States Forest Service lands, specifically the Tonto National Forest, before encountering the first of two dams that make Horseshoe Lake and Bartlett Lake. The cities of Camp Verde, Clarkdale and Cottonwood are the main population centers along the river. The Verde River and the Salt River confluence on the Salt River Pima-Maricopa Indian Community. The Salt River flows into the Gila River west of Phoenix.

In 1984, the United States Congress designated  of the Verde River as Wild and Scenic through the National Wild and Scenic River program. The Wild portion extends from there to the mouth of Red Creek, about  further downstream.

In 1986, a  stretch of the river was identified by the state of Arizona as a critical natural resource. This reach of the Verde River and its associated riparian zone, between the town of Clarkdale (near Tuzigoot National Monument) and the Bridgeport State Route 89A Bridge, became part of the Arizona State Parks system. The park, called the Verde River Greenway State Natural Area, encompasses . Dead Horse Ranch State Park, near Cottonwood, is adjacent to the Greenway.

At Drake, Arizona its canyon is termed "Hell Canyon", and it is spanned by the Hell Canyon Bridge, a road bridge built in 1923, and listed on the National Register of Historic Places.

Flora and fauna
Plants found in riparian zones along the river include ailanthus, Arizona alder, sycamore, and walnut trees; a variety of willows; reeds, cattails, box elder, and saltcedar, among others. Aquatic vertebrates along the Verde River include North American beaver, belted kingfishers, great blue herons, otters, Chiricahua leopard frogs, Sonoran mud turtles, and others. Among the 27 species of fish found in the river are carp, flathead catfish, roundtail chub, Gila chub, bass, desert sucker, mosquitofish, red shiner, and Sonora sucker.

Beaver were trapped "with considerable success" on the Verde River by fur trappers led by Ewing Young, and including Kit Carson, dating to 1829. Edgar Alexander Mearns wrote in his 1907 naturalist survey Mammals of the Mexican Boundary of the United States that beaver were present on nearly all streams of the Colorado Basin. Re-introductions of beaver in recent times have transformed even small desert streams into robust riparian habitat, increasing species abundance and diversity.

Recreation
Floating the Verde River in rafts and kayaks is a popular pastime as it runs through scenic valleys and the Mazatzal Wilderness.  The facilities described below are maintained by the Tonto National Forest authority. Kayak rentals, shuttles, boating gear and services are available in Clarkdale, Cottonwood and Camp Verde.  Several commercial outfitters offer guided trips on the Verde River.  Popular stretches for commercial boating include the Verde River @ Clarkdale, beginning at the Lower TAPCO River Access Point (RAP) and floating to the Tuzigoot RAP in Clarkdale; Skidmore RAP to Black Canyon RAP or Bignotti RAP on the Prescott National Forest between Cottonwood and Camp Verde; and White Bridge RAP to Clear Creek RAP or Beasley Flat RAP on the Prescott National Forest below Camp Verde.

Sport fishing
The nearest town with fuel, restaurants, lodging, groceries, and fishing tackle is Cottonwood. Fish species frequenting this stretch of the river include largemouth bass, redeye bass, sunfish, channel catfish, flathead catfish, yellow perch, chub, carp, and, in winter, rainbow trout. Crayfish and bullfrogs are also found.

The nearest town with fuel and other supplies and amenities is Camp Verde. Species along this stretch include largemouth and smallmouth bass, sunfish, channel and flathead catfish, carp, crayfish, and bullfrogs.

The same species that are found between Camp Verde and Horseshoe Lake are also present along a  stretch of the river from Horseshoe Lake to Bartlett Lake. The nearest town with fuel and supplies is Carefree.

Below Bartlett Lake, the elevation averages  over the next . Species here include largemouth bass, sunfish, channel and flathead catfish, tilapia, carp, crayfish, and bullfrogs. The nearest town with fuel and supplies is Fountain Hills.

See also

 List of National Wild and Scenic Rivers
 List of rivers of Arizona
 List of tributaries of the Colorado River

References

Works cited
 Arizona Fishin' Holes: The Arizona Game and Fish Department's Guide to Public Fishing Waters and Facilities in Arizona (2010). Phoenix: Arizona Game and Fish Department.
 Benke, Arthur C., ed., and Cushing, Colbert E., ed.; Blinn, Dean W. and Poff, N. Leroy (2005). "Chapter 11: Colorado River Basin" in Rivers of North America. Burlington, Massachusetts: Elsevier Academic Press. . .

External links

 Verde Wild and Scenic River – Coconino National Forest
 Viva La Verde – Viva La Verde Documentary Film
 Arizona State Parks: Verde River Greenway
 Arizona Boating Locations Facilities Map
 Arizona Fishing Locations Map
 Synthesis of Upper Verde River Research and Monitoring 1993–2008 United States Forest Service
 Video of Upper Verde River
 Wildlife at Work: Beaver, Otter and Native Fish on the Verde River by Seth Ring
  – Town of Clarkdale's – Verde River @ Clarkdale

Rivers of Arizona
Wild and Scenic Rivers of the United States
Rivers of Coconino County, Arizona
Rivers of Maricopa County, Arizona
Rivers of Yavapai County, Arizona
Coconino National Forest
Prescott National Forest
Tonto National Forest
Tributaries of the Salt River (Arizona)